The 1959–60 1re série season was the 39th season of the 1re série, the top level of ice hockey in France. Athletic Club de Boulogne-Billancourt won their second league title.

Final ranking
 1st place: Athletic Club de Boulogne-Billancourt
 2nd place: Chamonix Hockey Club
 3rd place: US Métro
 4th place: Ours de Villard-de-Lans
 5th place: Paris HC
 6th place: Diables Rouges de Briançon
 7th place: Racing Club de France
 8th place: ?
 9th place: ?
 10th place: ?
 11th place: Sporting Hockey Club Saint Gervais
 12th place Gap Hockey Club
 13th place: ?
 14th place: ?
 15th place: Club des Sports de Megève

External links
List of French champions on hockeyarchives.info

Fra
1959–60 in French ice hockey
Ligue Magnus seasons